Luke Abraham (The AK47) (born 26 September 1983 in Leicester) is a former professional rugby union player, who played for Lyon OU in the French Top 14 and the Sale Sharks and Leicester Tigers in the Premiership Rugby league in England.

A strong and pacy Leicester-born back-row player, Abraham came through the ranks after joining the Leicester Tigers at the age of 15. He took up the sport three years earlier at Bushloe High School and joined his local club, the Leicester Vipers, before becoming part of the Tigers set-up. He played an important role in the 2006–07 Guinness Premiership and the 2006-07 Heineken Cup double-winning campaign, making 12 Guinness Premiership appearances including eight starts as well as a single appearance in the 2006–07 EDF Energy Cup success.

A former England U-18, U-19 and U-21 international, he has also played for the England Saxons.  Abraham had a short spell playing at hooker during his time with Nelson's Bay Club Stoke in New Zealand during the summer of 2005. He was an U-21 League winner with the Tigers in 2002–03. He also won the Guinness A League in 2004–05 and 2005–06. He made his first-team debut as an 18-year-old against Worcester Warriors in January 2002.

In May 2008 it was announced that he had signed for Sale Sharks for the 2008–09 Guinness Premiership.

For the 2010–11 Rugby Pro D2 season, Abraham signed for Lyon OU.

References

External links 
 Sale Sharks profile
 Leicester Tigers profile
 Guinness Premiership profile

1983 births
Living people
English rugby union players
Leicester Tigers players
Lyon OU players
Sale Sharks players
Rugby union players from Leicester
Rugby union flankers
People educated at Leicester Grammar School